The 2023 CFL National Draft is a selection of National players by Canadian Football League teams that is scheduled to take place on May 2, 2023, at 8:00 pm ET. 72 players will be chosen from among eligible players from Canadian Universities across the country, as well as Canadian players playing in the NCAA. That number is subject to change if there are any additional forfeited selections.

For the first time the CFL will hold a players combine at the University of Waterloo's Feridun Hamdullahpur Field House.

Top prospects
Source: CFL Scouting Bureau rankings.

Draft order

Round one

Round two

Round three

Round four

Round five

Round six

Round seven

Round eight

Trades
In the explanations below, (D) denotes trades that took place during the draft, while (PD) indicates trades completed pre-draft.

Round one
 Hamilton ←→ Calgary (PD). Hamilton traded this selection, a third-round pick in this draft, a sixth-round pick in this draft, and a second-round pick in the 2024 CFL Draft to Calgary in exchange for Bo Levi Mitchell, a first-round pick in this draft, and a third-round pick in the 2024 CFL Draft.
 BC → Montreal (PD). BC traded this selection to Montreal in exchange for Vernon Adams.
 Toronto → BC (PD). Toronto traded this selection to BC in exchange for Jordan Williams.

Round two
 Hamilton → Edmonton (PD). Hamilton traded this selection and Jesse Gibbon to Edmonton in exchange for David Beard and a conditional fourth-round pick in this year's draft.
 Edmonton → Ottawa (PD). Edmonton traded the 12th overall selection to Ottawa in exchange for the rights to Woodly Appolon.

Round three
 Montreal → Edmonton (PD). Montreal traded this selection and Avery Ellis to Edmonton in exchange for Nafees Lyon and Thomas Costigan.
 BC → Ottawa (PD). BC traded this selection and a conditional fourth-round selection in the 2024 CFL Draft to Ottawa in exchange for Terry Williams.
 Hamilton → Calgary (PD). Hamilton traded this selection, a first-round pick in this draft, a sixth-round pick in this draft, and a second-round pick in the 2024 CFL Draft to Calgary in exchange for Bo Levi Mitchell, a first-round pick in this draft, and a third-round pick in the 2024 CFL Draft.

Round four
 Ottawa → Edmonton (PD). Ottawa traded this selection to Edmonton in exchange for Nick Arbuckle.
 Edmonton → Hamilton (PD). Edmonton traded a conditional fourth-round selection and David Beard to Hamilton in exchange for Jesse Gibbon and a second-round pick in this year's draft. The condition was confirmed to be fulfilled upon the release of the draft order by the league.

Round five
 Saskatchewan → Montreal (PD). Saskatchewan traded this selection to Montreal in exchange for Mario Alford. This selection was originally a sixth-round pick, but was upgraded after Alford played in at least nine games for the Roughriders.

Round six
 Edmonton → Toronto (PD). Edmonton traded this selection to Toronto in exchange for Jalen Collins and Martez Ivey.
 Montreal → Edmonton (PD). Montreal traded this selection to Edmonton in exchange for Walter Fletcher.
 Hamilton → Calgary (PD). Hamilton traded this selection, a first-round pick in this draft, a third-round pick in this draft, and a second-round pick in the 2024 CFL Draft to Calgary in exchange for Bo Levi Mitchell, a first-round pick in this draft, and a third-round pick in the 2024 CFL Draft.

Round seven
 Calgary → Saskatchewan (PD). Calgary traded this selection and a third-round selection in the 2023 CFL Global Draft to Saskatchewan in exchange for James Smith. This selection can be upgraded to a fifth-round selection depending on the number of games played by Smith for the Stampeders.
 Hamilton → Edmonton (PD). Hamilton traded this selection to Edmonton in exchange for Colin Kelly.
 Edmonton → Ottawa (PD). Edmonton traded this selection to Ottawa in exchange for Llevi Noel and an eighth-round pick in this year's draft.

Round eight
 Ottawa → Edmonton (PD). Ottawa traded this selection and Llevi Noel to Edmonton in exchange for a seventh-round pick in this year's draft.
 Edmonton → Hamilton (PD). Edmonton traded this selection to Hamilton in exchange for Jon Ryan.

Conditional trades
 Montreal → Calgary (PD). Montreal traded a conditional second-round selection to Calgary in exchange for the playing rights to Laurent Duvernay-Tardif. The condition will be fulfilled if Duvernay-Tardif signs with the Alouettes.

Forfeitures
 Edmonton forfeited their second round pick after selecting J-Min Pelley in the 2022 Supplemental Draft.
 Calgary forfeited their second round pick after selecting T. J. Rayam in the 2022 Supplemental Draft.

References
Trade references

General references

Canadian College Draft
2023 in Canadian football
CFL Draft